Leland is the administrative centre of the municipality of Leirfjord in Nordland county, Norway.  it is located on the northern shore of the Leirfjorden along Norwegian County Road 17. The village of Sundøy lies to the south and the village of Bardalssjøen lies to the northeast. Leland features two small grocery stores, a hairdresser, a café, a large sports centre, Leirfjord Church, and a number of other amenities. 

References

Villages in Nordland
Leirfjord